CMN Radio is the flagship satellite radio station owned by the Catholic Media Network in the Philippines. Its studios are located in San Juan, Metro Manila and operates 19 hours daily on Cignal Channel 311 and via livestreaming on the CMN website.

Network synopsis
CMN Radio pipes in a cumulative 9 hours of news content to its member-stations via its syndicated 90-minute national morning newscast CMN Pilipinas on weekdays and its Saturday health show Sagip Buhay. Outside its news hours, the content is satellite-exclusive, with the station serving as the Philippine relay broadcaster of EWTN Global Catholic Radio, occupying the midday and off-peak hours. Automated musical programming, and simulcasts of 99.1 Spirit FM Batangas's select program grids since March 19, 2018, is scheduled on the weekdays in between EWTN blocks and closedown, and weekends.

Unlike other national radio networks, programming distributed to stations outside its regular news service is done on special religious events, pooling with TV Maria and the local station in the area of the event.

Programming
CMN Pilipinas
Sagip Buhay
EWTN Global Catholic Radio hookup
 99.1 Spirit FM simulcast (select timeslots only)

Current on-air staff
 Ariel Ayala
 Cecille Roxas

See also
Catholic Media Network

References

Christian radio stations in the Philippines
Radio stations in the Philippines
Catholic radio stations
Radio stations established in 1997